KDZY (98.3 FM) is a radio station broadcasting a country format. Licensed to McCall, Idaho, United States, the station is currently owned by Inspirational Family Radio.

References

External links
KDZY's official website

Country radio stations in the United States
DZY
Radio stations established in 1978